The 2015 Bulgarian Basketball Cup was the 61nd edition of the annual cup tournament in Bulgaria.It is managed by the Bulgarian Basketball Federation and was held in Pleven, in the Balkanstory Hall on February 19–22, 2015. Cherno More Port Varna won their 4th cup. Stanimir Marinov was named MVP.

Qualified teams
The first seven teams after the first stage of the 2014–15 NBL regular season and Spartak Pleven as a host qualified for the tournament.

Bracket

References

Bulgarian Basketball Cup
Cup